Sarsiado (also sometimes spelled as sarciado) is a fish dish from the Philippines which features tomatoes and eggs.
The name sarsiado in the Tagalog language means "cooked with a thick sauce". The name is derived from the Filipino word sarsa (referring to a thick sauce) which in turn is from the Spanish word salsa, which means "sauce".

Origin and preparation

Sarsiado is a delicacy from the Philippines which features a sauce predominantly composed of tomatoes and eggs. The bangus (or milkfish) is cleaned by removing the gills and other parts, rubbed with salt and then washed afterwards to remove blood and other scum.  It is then fried (usually shallow-fried, but deep-fried is not unheard-of) in a high temperature until the fish is cooked. The sarsa is then cooked in a separate saucepan - garlic, onions, and tomatoes are sauteed - in that order until cooked (with water sometimes added to maintain some moisture), and then beaten eggs are added and cooked to a rare done-ness. A souring element as well as a sweetening one may be added to the sarsa. Other fishes such as tilapia are also used in lieu of milkfish.

The sauce features a guisado - a sautee flavor combination of garlic, onion and tomatoes (although tomatoes are sometimes omitted, depending on the dish).

The dish is essentially a combination of two separate dishes: piniritong isda (fried fish), and tomato-scrambled eggs (for the sarsa), similar to the Chinese's stir-fried tomato and scrambled eggs. 

A similar dish is the Philippine version of the escabeche which also has fried fish topped with a sauce.

See also

 Adobo
 Kare-kare
 Kaldereta
 List of fish dishes
 List of tomato dishes

References

Philippine stews
Guamanian cuisine
Fish dishes
Tomato dishes
Egg dishes